G. nigra may refer to:
 Geochelone nigra, the largest living tortoise species, native to seven islands of the Galápagos archipelago
 Gila nigra, the headwater chub, a fish species found in Arizona and New Mexico

Synonyms
 Gymnadenia nigra, a synonym for Nigritella nigra, an orchid species found in Europe and Israel

See also
 Nigra (disambiguation)